"Ugly American" is a stereotype depicting American citizens as exhibiting loud, arrogant, demeaning, thoughtless, ignorant, and ethnocentric behavior mainly abroad, but also at home. Although the term is usually associated with or applied to travelers and tourists, it also applies to U.S. corporate businesses in the international arena.

Origin 

The term seems to have entered popular culture as the title of a 1958 book by authors William Lederer and Eugene Burdick.  In 1963, the book was made into a film directed by George Englund and starring Marlon Brando.

The best-selling, loosely fictional account provided contrasting characters with different approaches to opposing Communist influence in Southeast Asia, and the use of foreign aid in particular.  The majority of the Americans exhibit a range of blundering, corrupt, and incompetent behaviors, often concentrating on impractical projects that will serve more to benefit American contractors than the local population.  A minority are effective because they employ knowledge of the local language and culture, but most of these are marginalized and some even considered suspect.  As a result, their influence is more limited than it should be.

The title character, Homer Atkins, is introduced late in the book.  He is "ugly" only in his physical appearance.  Perversely, Atkins embodies the opposite traits from the pejorative traits now popularly associated with the term "Ugly American". Atkins's unattractive features, rough clothing and dirty hands are contrasted with the bureaucrats' freshly pressed clothes, clean fingers, and smooth cheeks.  Their behaviors have the opposite contrast: Atkins cares about the people of southeast Asia and wants to help them create practical solutions to their everyday problems; the bureaucrats want to build highways and dams that are not yet needed, and with no concern for the many other projects that will have to be completed before they can be used. The book led to a move by President Dwight Eisenhower to study and reform American aid programs in the region.

In the book, a fictional Burmese journalist wrote, "For some reason, the people I meet in my country are not the same as the ones I knew in the United States. A mysterious change seems to come over Americans when they go to a foreign land. They isolate themselves socially. They live pretentiously. They're loud and ostentatious. Perhaps they're frightened and defensive, or maybe they're not properly trained and make mistakes out of ignorance."

The idea of the ignorant or badly behaving American traveler long predates this book. Mark Twain wrote about The Innocents Abroad in the nineteenth century, and Algonquin Round Table member Donald Ogden Stewart wrote Mr and Mrs Haddock Abroad in 1924.

Usage

Sports
The term has also been widely used in the international sporting arena. The term was invoked 
after Justin Leonard holed a 45-foot putt on the 17th green at the 33rd Ryder Cup held in September 1999, resulting in extensive and adverse media coverage.

Later, at the 2000 Sydney Olympics, the term was widely used after members of the US 4 × 100 relay team pranced around the stadium, flexing their muscles and making poses with the American flag, after winning a gold medal. One foreign journalist called the incident "one of the most cringe-making exhibitions that the Olympics has seen".  This event was heavily criticized even by the American press and public.  The members of the relay team were contrite and apologized for the incident the same day. Then, at the 2006 Winter Olympics in Turin, the term was regularly used after the skiing superstar Bode Miller, who bragged about skiing drunk before the Olympics, was adversely compared to the term "Miller time", and went home with no medals. A lesser-known teammate was sent home for fighting in a bar.

In tennis, the term was used in regard to players at the 1987 Davis Cup for unsportsmanlike conduct. John McEnroe was regularly cited in the media as being an "Ugly American" for his on-court tantrums and off-court negative comments about London and Paris. In contrast, Andre Agassi who early in his tennis career was labeled a "potential ugly American", managed to transform himself into a crowd favourite. In women's tennis, Serena Williams's outburst at the 2009 US Open semifinal against Kim Clijsters, and again at the 2018 tournament reiterated the "Ugly American" label.

After the United States women's national soccer team lost to Sweden in the quarterfinals of women's football of the 2016 Summer Olympics in Brazil, Hope Solo called the Swedish team cowards unleashing multiple Twitter references associating her with this term. At the same Olympics, Gold medalist Ryan Lochte was named the ugly American by media outlets after falsely reporting a robbery at gunpoint during the tournament. Local police investigation showed that he and fellow swimmers in fact caused damage to a petrol station in Rio and were required to pay for the damage.

Politics

The term appeared within a few years of publication of the book The Ugly American. In 1964, U.S. President Lyndon B. Johnson used it in his Great Society speech.

In May 2008, the US House sub-committee passed a bill (House Resolution 4080) that would allow more foreign fashion models to work in the United States, and was subsequently dubbed the "ugly American bill". George W. Bush was often referred to as "The Ugly American" in part because of his stance on foreign policies. In 2007, Presidential hopeful John McCain outlined a series of measures to roll back Bush policies and counter the "ugly American" image. Numerous opinion pieces have accused President Donald Trump of behaving in a way that fits the “Ugly American” stereotype, including in The New York Times, The Washington Post, Forbes, The Nation, Financial Times, and The Sydney Morning Herald.

Popular culture
The "ugly American" tourist stereotype has been heavily depicted in films, with characters such as Sheriff J.W. Pepper in The Man with the Golden Gun, the Griswald family in National Lampoon's European Vacation, and Ralph Jones in King Ralph. The 2004 film EuroTrip was originally slated to be named "The Ugly Americans" due to its depiction of stereotypical American tourists in Europe. The producers changed the title shortly before its release. A study carried out in 2002 revealed that Hollywood also contributes to the "Ugly American" image. The study found that the more access other countries had to American programs, the higher their negative attitudes toward Americans tended to be.

The 2008 black comedy film In Bruges has the two protagonists, Irish hitmen hiding out in the Belgian city of Bruges, encounter obese American tourists who fit the "ugly American" stereotype, being crude, ignorant, loud and boorish. The movie Sex and the City 2 has been cited as a typical portrayal of the "ugly American" image, where Samantha, one of four best girlfriends, makes fun of Middle Eastern culture and women in traditional dress during a visit to the United Arab Emirates.

The Simpsons episode "The Regina Monologues" had the Simpson family getting into all sorts of trouble in England due to their boorish behavior, which results from ignorance of and unconcern for the local culture.

See also

 American exceptionalism
 Americentrism
 Anti-American sentiment
 Plastic Paddy
 Stereotypes of Americans
 The Quiet American
 Ugly Americans (TV series)
 Ugly Americans: The True Story of the Ivy League Cowboys Who Raided the Asian Markets for Millions

References 

Foreign relations of the United States
Ethnic and racial stereotypes
Ethnic and religious slurs